The Hero MTB Himalaya is an annual mountain bike race held in the mountainous state of Himachal Pradesh, India. Started in 2005, the race covers nearly  16500 metres of climbing at an average altitude of 2200 meters in a span of 8 days and is one of the toughest MTB stage races in the world . The race is sponsored by Hero Cycles and Himachal tourism .

Venues
Started in 2005, the first 5 races took the route from Shimla To Manali. In 2010, the route was changed and a loop was taken where the race began and finished from Shimla. It passes through Shimla, Kullu and Mandi districts.

In 2016, the route was once again changed from Shimla to Dharamshala and since then the race has been also called as ride to Land of Lamas.

Categories of Competition
The race has had the following categories for cyclists

Men Solo
Women Solo
Masters Solo (age 40 and above) 
Teams of Two 
Grandmasters Solo

Sponsors
Since 2014, the event has been sponsored by Hero Cycles and UT Bikes. In the recent events Discovery channel, Sportskeeda and The Times of India officially partnered the MTB Himalaya as media partners.

In 2017, Coleman India joined hands with the race as official outdoor partner. 

The International Mountain Bicycling Association has been a race partner with MTB Himalaya from the beginning.

Participation
The Hero MTB Himalaya has seen about 1500 riders take part  in the 14 years of existence. They have seen participants come from US, Austria, Germany, Nepal, Bhutan and India. In 2011, 104 riders started, and only 42 finished.

References

Sport in Himachal Pradesh
Cycle races in India
Cycle racing in India
Mountain biking events
Adventure tourism in India